"You Laughed and Laughed and Laughed" is a poem by Nigerian writer Gabriel Okara.  One of the most popular in his oeuvre, it is a frequent feature of anthologies, such as A New Book of African Verse edited by John Reed and Clive Wake (Heinemann African Writers Series, 1985).  "The piece belongs with the best of Senghor's nostalgic verse," wrote Michael J. C. Echeruo in a tribute to Okara on the occasion of his 70th birthday, "with the militancy of many of David Diop's lyrics, and certainly with J. P. Clark's 'Ivbie', another of my favorite African poems.  Okara's poem is more relaxed than these, however, more ironic, less tortured.  In some ways, of course, it is less urgent, less strident, less involved.  If Clark's 'Ivbie' was complex and for good reason, You laughed, and laughed, and laughed seemed also appropriately straightforward: proud without arrogance, hurting without showing it, and blunt without rudeness."  The first of Okara's poems that it was Echeruo's pleasure to read, it was also in his opinion the most enduring. The poem is sometimes wrongly attributed to South African writer Dennis Brutus.

Synopsis 
Gabriel Okara's poem consists of 10 stanzas and describes the interplay of different interpretations of the same sounds, sights, and dances. The interaction that takes place within the poem is commonly thought to be between a white colonialist and an African native. The poem follows a trope in African literature of "The White Man Laughed", which embodies the notion of dismay and cynical derision of the beliefs, practices, and norms of an African. However, Okara's poem can be seen to transcend the acceptance of the derision of the White Man and present a wiser African intellectual. The poem concludes with the African man teaching the White Man of his ignorance and helping him realize that the native beliefs of the African are not primitive nor removed from intellectual thought. 

As summarized by Pushpa Naidu Parekh, "In 'You Laughed and Laughed and Laughed,' the colonizer's mockery and contemptuous disparagement of indigenous African culture and worldview are confronted and ultimately silenced by the warmth of the native's 'fire' laughter."

Poem

References

Further reading 
Echeruo, Michael J. C., "Gabriel Okara: a Poet and His Seasons", World Literature Today, 1992: 454–456.

Postcolonial poetry
Poetry by Gabriel Okara